The 1996 Kansas City Royals season was a season in American baseball. It involved the Royals finishing 5th in the American League Central with a record of 75 wins and 86 losses.

Offseason
 October 22, 1995: Doug Linton was signed as a free agent by the Royals.
 December 19, 1995: Brent Mayne was traded by the Royals to the New York Mets for Al Shirley (minors).
 December 21, 1995: Wally Joyner and Aaron Dorlarque (minors) were traded by the Royals to the San Diego Padres for Bip Roberts and Bryan Wolff (minors).
 January 31, 1996: Tim Belcher was signed as a free agent by the Royals.

Regular season

Season standings

Record vs. opponents

Game log

|- bgcolor="ffbbbb"
| 1 || April 2 || @ Orioles || 2–4 || Mussina || Appier (0–1) || Myers || 46,818 || 0–1
|- bgcolor="ffbbbb"
| 2 || April 3 || @ Orioles || 1–7 || Wells || Gubicza (0–1) || — || 40,068 || 0–2
|- bgcolor="ffbbbb"
| 3 || April 4 || @ Orioles || 3–5 || Rhodes || Pichardo (0–1) || Myers || 38,753 || 0–3
|- bgcolor="ccffcc"
| 4 || April 5 || Red Sox || 5–4 (12) || Clark (1–0) || Pennington || — || 39,526 || 1–3
|- bgcolor="ccffcc"
| 5 || April 6 || Red Sox || 7–3 || Pichardo (1–1) || Belinda || — || 17,339 || 2–3
|- bgcolor="ffbbbb"
| 6 || April 7 || Red Sox || 1–3 || Moyer || Gubicza (0–2) || Slocumb || 13,183 || 2–4
|- bgcolor="ffbbbb"
| 7 || April 9 || @ Yankees || 3–7 || Pettitte || Haney (0–1) || — || 56,329 || 2–5
|- bgcolor="ffbbbb"
| 8 || April 11 || @ Yankees || 3–5 || Key || Belcher (0–1) || Howe || 17,519 || 2–6
|- bgcolor="ccffcc"
| 9 || April 12 || @ Brewers || 4–1 || Appier (1–1) || Bones || Montgomery (1) || 7,113 || 3–6
|- bgcolor="ccffcc"
| 10 || April 13 || @ Brewers || 3–2 || Gubicza (1–2) || Sparks || Montgomery (2) || 9,224 || 4–6
|- bgcolor="ffbbbb"
| 11 || April 14 || @ Brewers || 2–5 || McDonald || Haney (0–2) || Miranda || 19,131 || 4–7
|- bgcolor="ffbbbb"
| 12 || April 15 || White Sox || 10–11 || Karchner || Pichardo (1–2) || Hernandez || 12,653 || 4–8
|- bgcolor="ccffcc"
| 13 || April 16 || White Sox || 6–5 || Belcher (1–1) || Bere || Montgomery (3) || 12,399 || 5–8
|- bgcolor="ffbbbb"
| 14 || April 17 || White Sox || 1–3 || Fernandez || Appier (1–2) || Hernandez || 13,350 || 5–9
|- bgcolor="ffbbbb"
| 15 || April 18 || Brewers || 2–8 || Sparks || Gubicza (1–3) || — || 13,153 || 5–10
|- bgcolor="ffbbbb"
| 16 || April 19 || Brewers || 2–8 || McDonald || Haney (0–3) || — || 15,321 || 5–11
|- bgcolor="ffbbbb"
| 17 || April 20 || Brewers || 4–12 || Miranda || Jacome (0–1) || — || 17,220 || 5–12
|- bgcolor="ffbbbb"
| 18 || April 21 || Brewers || 4–5 || Wickander || Pichardo (1–3) || Fetters || 14,666 || 5–13
|- bgcolor="ffbbbb"
| 19 || April 22 || Yankees || 2–6 || Cone || Appier (1–3) || — || 14,763 || 5–14
|- bgcolor="ccffcc"
| 20 || April 23 || Yankees || 5–2 || Gubicza (2–3) || Key || Montgomery (4) || 12,536 || 6–14
|- bgcolor="ffbbbb"
| 21 || April 24 || Orioles || 8–11 || Mercker || Haney (0–4) || — || 13,962 || 6–15
|- bgcolor="ffbbbb"
| 22 || April 25 || Orioles || 2–3 || Rhodes || Valera (0–1) || Myers || 16,090 || 6–16
|- bgcolor="ccffcc"
| 23 || April 26 || @ Red Sox || 4–3 || Belcher (2–1) || Clemens || Montgomery (5) || 22,385 || 7–16
|- bgcolor="ccffcc"
| 24 || April 27 || @ Red Sox || 10–0 || Appier (2–3) || Sele || — || 29,459 || 8–16
|- bgcolor="ccffcc"
| 25 || April 28 || @ Red Sox || 9–7 || Robinson (1–0) || Slocumb || Montgomery (6) || 32,491 || 9–16
|- bgcolor="ffbbbb"
| 26 || April 29 || @ Twins || 6–11 || Hansell || Clark (1–1) || Bennett || 10,237 || 9–17
|- bgcolor="ffbbbb"
| 27 || April 30 || @ Twins || 7–16 || Naulty || Magnante (0–1) || — || 10,503 || 9–18
|-

|- bgcolor="ffbbbb"
| 28 || May 1 || @ Twins || 5–6 (10) || Stevens || Montgomery (0–1) || — || 11,975 || 9–19
|- bgcolor="ccffcc"
| 29 || May 3 || Athletics || 3–1 || Appier (3–3) || Reyes || Montgomery (7) || 14,452 || 10–19
|- bgcolor="ffbbbb"
| 30 || May 4 || Athletics || 2–5 || Wojciechowski || Gubicza (2–4) || Groom || 15,987 || 10–20
|- bgcolor="ccffcc"
| 31 || May 5 || Athletics || 2–0 || Haney (1–4) || Prieto || — || 16,589 || 11–20
|- bgcolor="ccffcc"
| 32 || May 6 || @ Angels || 9–4 || Belcher (3–1) || Leftwich || Pichardo (1) || 14,447 || 12–20
|- bgcolor="ccffcc"
| 33 || May 7 || @ Angels || 5–3 || Valera (1–1) || Abbott || Montgomery (8) || 14,657 || 13–20
|- bgcolor="ccffcc"
| 34 || May 8 || @ Angels || 3–1 (14) || Pichardo (2–3) || Eichhorn || — || 16,210 || 14–20
|- bgcolor="ccffcc"
| 35 || May 9 || @ Angels || 8–2 || Gubicza (3–4) || Grimsley || — || 15,302 || 15–20
|- bgcolor="ccffcc"
| 36 || May 10 || @ Mariners || 14–10 || Valera (2–1) || Davis || — || 24,231 || 16–20
|- bgcolor="ffbbbb"
| 37 || May 11 || @ Mariners || 1–11 || Wolcott || Belcher (3–2) || Carmona || 43,297 || 16–21
|- bgcolor="ffbbbb"
| 38 || May 12 || @ Mariners || 5–8 || Johnson || Linton (0–1) || Charlton || 27,470 || 16–22
|- bgcolor="ffbbbb"
| 39 || May 13 || @ Rangers || 6–7 || Cook || Montgomery (0–2) || Henneman || 22,981 || 16–23
|- bgcolor="ffbbbb"
| 40 || May 14 || @ Rangers || 0–10 || Hill || Gubicza (3–5) || — || 28,999 || 16–24
|- bgcolor="ccffcc"
| 41 || May 15 || @ Rangers || 3–1 || Haney (2–4) || Pavlik || Montgomery (9) || 26,881 || 17–24
|- bgcolor="ccffcc"
| 42 || May 17 || Blue Jays || 4–2 || Belcher (4–2) || Guzman || Montgomery (10) || 20,079 || 18–24
|- bgcolor="ffbbbb"
| 43 || May 18 || Blue Jays || 2–6 || Viola || Appier (3–4) || — || 18,116 || 18–25
|- bgcolor="ffbbbb"
| 44 || May 19 || Blue Jays || 2–3 || Hanson || Gubicza (3–6) || Timlin || 15,039 || 18–26
|- bgcolor="ccffcc"
| 45 || May 20 || Blue Jays || 5–4 || Haney (3–4) || Hentgen || Montgomery (11) || 14,303 || 19–26
|- bgcolor="ccffcc"
| 46 || May 21 || @ Tigers || 7–1 || Linton (1–1) || Williams || Valera (1) || 24,372 || 20–26
|- bgcolor="ccffcc"
| 47 || May 22 || @ Tigers || 6–4 || Belcher (5–2) || Farrell || Montgomery (12) || 12,890 || 21–26
|- bgcolor="ccffcc"
| 48 || May 23 || Rangers || 4–2 || Appier (4–4) || Oliver || Montgomery (13) || 15,612 || 22–26
|- bgcolor="ccffcc"
| 49 || May 24 || Rangers || 8–0 || Gubicza (4–6) || Witt || — || 13,696 || 23–26
|- bgcolor="ffbbbb"
| 50 || May 25 || Rangers || 1–2 || Helling || Haney (3–5) || Henneman || 23,668 || 23–27
|- bgcolor="ffbbbb"
| 51 || May 26 || Rangers || 4–6 || Hill || Linton (1–2) || Henneman || 22,665 || 23–28
|- bgcolor="ccffcc"
| 52 || May 27 || Tigers || 5–4 (13) || Montgomery (1–2) || Veres || — || 19,776 || 24–28
|- bgcolor="ffbbbb"
| 53 || May 29 || Tigers || 4–5 || Gohr || Appier (4–5) || Walker || 13,712 || 24–29
|- bgcolor="ffbbbb"
| 54 || May 31 || @ Blue Jays || 2–4 || Hentgen || Gubicza (4–7) || Timlin || 33,194 || 24–30
|-

|- bgcolor="ffbbbb"
| 55 || June 1 || @ Blue Jays || 3–5 (10) || Crabtree || Montgomery (1–3) || — || 31,107 || 24–31
|- bgcolor="ccffcc"
| 56 || June 2 || @ Blue Jays || 7–5 || Belcher (6–2) || Janzen || Montgomery (14) || 32,253 || 25–31
|- bgcolor="ffbbbb"
| 57 || June 3 || @ Athletics || 1–2 || Wasdin || Appier (4–6) || Taylor || 6,465 || 25–32
|- bgcolor="ffbbbb"
| 58 || June 4 || @ Athletics || 3–8 || Wengert || Gubicza (4–8) || — || 11,524 || 25–33
|- bgcolor="ccffcc"
| 59 || June 5 || @ Athletics || 5–2 || Haney (4–5) || Johns || Montgomery (15) || 8,113 || 26–33
|- bgcolor="ccffcc"
| 60 || June 7 || Mariners || 9–5 || Valera (3–1) || Wolcott || — || 20,891 || 27–33
|- bgcolor="ccffcc"
| 61 || June 8 || Mariners || 12–8 || Appier (5–6) || Milacki || Montgomery (16) || 30,022 || 28–33
|- bgcolor="ffbbbb"
| 62 || June 9 || Mariners || 2–3 || Hitchcock || Gubicza (4–9) || Charlton || 20,489 || 28–34
|- bgcolor="ffbbbb"
| 63 || June 10 || Angels || 5–7 (10) || McElroy || Pugh (0–1) || Percival || 15,691 || 28–35
|- bgcolor="ffbbbb"
| 64 || June 11 || Angels || 9–11 || McElroy || Valera (3–2) || Percival || 16,687 || 28–36
|- bgcolor="ffbbbb"
| 65 || June 12 || Angels || 3–4 (10) || McElroy || Montgomery (1–4) || Percival || 15,428 || 28–37
|- bgcolor="ccffcc"
| 66 || June 13 || Orioles || 10–2 || Linton (2–2) || Mercker || — || 20,108 || 29–37
|- bgcolor="ffbbbb"
| 67 || June 14 || Orioles || 1–6 || Mussina || Gubicza (4–10) || — || 28,502 || 29–38
|- bgcolor="ccffcc"
| 68 || June 15 || Orioles || 7–6 (16) || Magnante (1–1) || Krivda || — || 24,784 || 30–38
|- bgcolor="ffbbbb"
| 69 || June 16 || Orioles || 5–13 || Coppinger || Jacome (0–2) || Mills || 19,437 || 30–39
|- bgcolor="ffbbbb"
| 70 || June 17 || @ Brewers || 4–9 || Burrows || Appier (5–7) || — || 9,315 || 30–40
|- bgcolor="ffbbbb"
| 71 || June 18 || @ Brewers || 1–9 || Karl || Linton (2–3) || Potts || 9,116 || 30–41
|- bgcolor="ccffcc"
| 72 || June 19 || @ Brewers || 8–4 (10) || Pichardo (3–3) || Mercedes || — || 13,431 || 31–41
|- bgcolor="ffbbbb"
| 73 || June 21 || @ Orioles || 3–9 || Rhodes || Haney (4–6) || — || 47,644 || 31–42
|- bgcolor="ffbbbb"
| 74 || June 22 || @ Orioles || 3–5 || Erickson || Montgomery (1–5) || — || 47,534 || 31–43
|- bgcolor="ccffcc"
| 75 || June 23 || @ Orioles || 4–0 || Appier (6–7) || Krivda || — || 47,608 || 32–43
|- bgcolor="ffbbbb"
| 76 || June 25 || Brewers || 3–5 || Bones || Gubicza (4–11) || Fetters || 14,448 || 32–44
|- bgcolor="ccffcc"
| 77 || June 26 || Brewers || 7–3 || Haney (5–6) || Givens || — || 14,560 || 33–44
|- bgcolor="ffbbbb"
| 78 || June 27 || Brewers || 2–6 || McDonald || Belcher (6–3) || — || 17,670 || 33–45
|- bgcolor="ccffcc"
| 79 || June 28 || Twins || 6–2 || Appier (7–7) || Radke || — || 21,515 || 34–45
|- bgcolor="ffbbbb"
| 80 || June 29 || Twins || 7–12 || Trombley || Linton (2–4) || — || 23,232 || 34–46
|- bgcolor="ffbbbb"
| 81 || June 30 || Twins || 2–5 || Rodriguez || Gubicza (4–12) || Stevens || 28,246 || 34–47
|-

|- bgcolor="ccffcc"
| 82 || July 1 || @ Indians || 4–2 || Haney (6–6) || Nagy || — || 40,814 || 35–47
|- bgcolor="ffbbbb"
| 83 || July 2 || @ Indians || 2–3 || Poole || Belcher (6–4) || — || 42,283 || 35–48
|- bgcolor="ffbbbb"
| 84 || July 3 || @ Indians || 4–6 || Tavarez || Magnante (1–2) || Shuey || 42,470 || 35–49
|- bgcolor="ccffcc"
| 85 || July 4 || @ Twins || 5–3 || Linton (3–4) || Robertson || Montgomery (17) || 37,295 || 36–49
|- bgcolor="ffbbbb"
| 86 || July 5 || @ Twins || 8–9 || Guardado || Montgomery (1–6) || — || 18,465 || 36–50
|- bgcolor="ccffcc"
| 87 || July 6 || @ Twins || 8–5 || Haney (7–6) || Aguilera || Montgomery (18) || 18,699 || 37–50
|- bgcolor="ccffcc"
| 88 || July 7 || @ Twins || 8–2 || Belcher (7–4) || Aldred || — || 14,251 || 38–50
|- bgcolor="ccffcc"
| 89 || July 11 || White Sox || 3–2 || Haney (8–6) || Alvarez || — || 22,928 || 39–50
|- bgcolor="ffbbbb"
| 90 || July 12 || White Sox || 6–7 || Tapani || Belcher (7–5) || Hernandez || 18,458 || 39–51
|- bgcolor="ffbbbb"
| 91 || July 13 || White Sox || 1–3 || Fernandez || Rosado (0–1) || — || 25,363 || 39–52
|- bgcolor="ffbbbb"
| 92 || July 14 || White Sox || 2–3 || Baldwin || Linton (3–5) || Hernandez || 17,024 || 39–53
|- bgcolor="ccffcc"
| 93 || July 15 || Indians || 6–3 || Magnante (2–2) || Tavarez || Montgomery (19) || 22,294 || 40–53
|- bgcolor="ffbbbb"
| 94 || July 16 || Indians || 4–10 || McDowell || Haney (8–7) || — || 16,871 || 40–54
|- bgcolor="ccffcc"
| 95 || July 17 || Indians || 3–2 || Belcher (8–5) || Hershiser || Montgomery (20) || 19,532 || 41–54
|- bgcolor="ccffcc"
| 96 || July 18 || @ White Sox || 7–1 || Appier (8–7) || Fernandez || Pichardo (2) || 17,657 || 42–54
|- bgcolor="ccffcc"
| 97 || July 19 || @ White Sox || 7–4 (10) || Montgomery (2–6) || Hernandez || — || 19,604 || 43–54
|- bgcolor="ccffcc"
| 98 || July 20 || @ White Sox || 7–5 || Linton (4–5) || Keyser || Montgomery (21) || 32,282 || 44–54
|- bgcolor="ffbbbb"
| 99 || July 21 || @ White Sox || 3–6 || Alvarez || Haney (8–8) || Hernandez || 21,253 || 44–55
|- bgcolor="ccffcc"
| 100 || July 22 || @ Red Sox || 5–2 || Belcher (9–5) || Gordon || — || 28,109 || 45–55
|- bgcolor="ccffcc"
| 101 || July 23 || @ Red Sox || 7–5 || Appier (9–7) || Sele || — || 23,711 || 46–55
|- bgcolor="ffbbbb"
| 102 || July 24 || @ Red Sox || 2–12 || Moyer || Linton (4–6) || — || 33,381 || 46–56
|- bgcolor="ccffcc"
| 103 || July 25 || @ Yankees || 7–0 || Rosado (1–1) || Hutton || — || 23,475 || 47–56
|- bgcolor="ffbbbb"
| 104 || July 26 || @ Yankees || 1–15 || Key || Haney (8–9) || — || 23,782 || 47–57
|- bgcolor="ffbbbb"
| 105 || July 27 || @ Yankees || 4–5 || Rogers || Belcher (9–6) || Wetteland || 42,044 || 47–58
|- bgcolor="ffbbbb"
| 106 || July 28 || @ Yankees || 2–3 || Wetteland || Jacome (0–3) || — || 35,658 || 47–59
|- bgcolor="ccffcc"
| 107 || July 30 || Red Sox || 7–0 || Rosado (2–1) || Eshelman || — || 17,166 || 48–59
|- bgcolor="ffbbbb"
| 108 || July 31 || Red Sox || 3–5 || Wakefield || Haney (8–10) || Slocumb || 17,527 || 48–60
|-

|- bgcolor="ccffcc"
| 109 || August 1 || Red Sox || 9–4 || Belcher (10–6) || Clemens || — || 18,934 || 49–60
|- bgcolor="ccffcc"
| 110 || August 2 || Yankees || 4–3 (10) || Montgomery (3–6) || Rivera || — || 28,618 || 50–60
|- bgcolor="ccffcc"
| 111 || August 3 || Yankees || 11–4 || Linton (5–6) || Weathers || — || 29,355 || 51–60
|- bgcolor="ffbbbb"
| 112 || August 4 || Yankees || 3–5 || Pettitte || Rosado (2–2) || — || 24,624 || 51–61
|- bgcolor="ffbbbb"
| 113 || August 5 || Yankees || 2–5 || Key || Pichardo (3–4) || Wetteland || 22,865 || 51–62
|- bgcolor="ccffcc"
| 114 || August 6 || Athletics || 9–2 || Belcher (11–6) || Wasdin || — || 14,028 || 52–62
|- bgcolor="ccffcc"
| 115 || August 7 || Athletics || 7–0 || Appier (10–7) || Prieto || — || 15,517 || 53–62
|- bgcolor="ffbbbb"
| 116 || August 8 || Athletics || 1–2 || Wengert || Linton (5–7) || Taylor || 19,197 || 53–63
|- bgcolor="ccffcc"
| 117 || August 9 || @ Angels || 5–3 || Rosado (3–2) || Langston || Montgomery (22) || 35,977 || 54–63
|- bgcolor="ccffcc"
| 118 || August 10 || @ Angels || 18–3 || Haney (9–10) || Abbott || — || 21,657 || 55–63
|- bgcolor="ffbbbb"
| 119 || August 11 || @ Angels || 5–6 || Springer || Belcher (11–7) || — || 18,591 || 55–64
|- bgcolor="ccffcc"
| 120 || August 12 || @ Mariners || 10–4 || Appier (11–7) || Moyer || Huisman (1) || 43,476 || 56–64
|- bgcolor="ffbbbb"
| 121 || August 13 || @ Mariners || 5–9 || Mulholland || Linton (5–8) || Johnson || 21,961 || 56–65
|- bgcolor="ccffcc"
| 122 || August 14 || @ Mariners || 3–1 || Rosado (4–2) || Wolcott || Montgomery (23) || 23,709 || 57–65
|- bgcolor="ffbbbb"
| 123 || August 16 || @ Rangers || 3–5 || Burkett || Haney (9–11) || Henneman || 32,053 || 57–66
|- bgcolor="ccffcc"
| 124 || August 17 || @ Rangers || 4–1 || Belcher (12–7) || Hill || — || 41,855 || 58–66
|- bgcolor="ffbbbb"
| 125 || August 18 || @ Rangers || 3–10 || Gross || Appier (11–8) || — || 30,480 || 58–67
|- bgcolor="ffbbbb"
| 126 || August 19 || Blue Jays || 1–2 || Spoljaric || Rosado (4–3) || Timlin || 16,862 || 58–68
|- bgcolor="ffbbbb"
| 127 || August 20 || Blue Jays || 5–6 (14) || Timlin || Huisman (0–1) || — || 14,568 || 58–69
|- bgcolor="ffbbbb"
| 128 || August 21 || Blue Jays || 2–6 || Guzman || Haney (9–12) || — || 12,238 || 58–70
|- bgcolor="ffbbbb"
| 129 || August 22 || Tigers || 3–10 || Thompson || Belcher (12–8) || — || 14,699 || 58–71
|- bgcolor="ffbbbb"
| 130 || August 23 || Tigers || 2–3 || Sager || Appier (11–9) || Olson || 15,603 || 58–72
|- bgcolor="ccffcc"
| 131 || August 24 || Tigers || 9–2 || Rosado (5–3) || Olivares || — || 28,011 || 59–72
|- bgcolor="ffbbbb"
| 132 || August 25 || Tigers || 4–7 || Van Poppel || Linton (5–9) || Myers || 15,123 || 59–73
|- bgcolor="ccffcc"
| 133 || August 27 || Rangers || 4–3 (10) || Montgomery (4–6) || Russell || — || 12,907 || 60–73
|- bgcolor="ccffcc"
| 134 || August 28 || Rangers || 4–3 (12) || Huisman (1–1) || Gross || — || 12,695 || 61–73
|- bgcolor="ffbbbb"
| 135 || August 29 || @ Tigers || 1–4 || Eischen || Appier (11–10) || Lima || 7,882 || 61–74
|- bgcolor="ffbbbb"
| 136 || August 30 || @ Tigers || 0–4 || Van Poppel || Rosado (5–4) || — || 16,498 || 61–75
|- bgcolor="ccffcc"
| 137 || August 31 || @ Tigers || 3–1 || Linton (6–9) || Lira || Montgomery (24) || 16,270 || 62–75
|-

|- bgcolor="ccffcc"
| 138 || September 1 || @ Tigers || 3–2 (13) || Huisman (2–1) || Myers || Jacome (1) || 17,647 || 63–75
|- bgcolor="ccffcc"
| 139 || September 2 || @ Blue Jays || 2–0 || Belcher (13–8) || Hanson || — || 28,177 || 64–75
|- bgcolor="ccffcc"
| 140 || September 3 || @ Blue Jays || 5–2 || Appier (12–10) || Hentgen || — || 25,729 || 65–75
|- bgcolor="ffbbbb"
| 141 || September 4 || @ Blue Jays || 0–6 || Williams || Rosado (5–5) || — || 25,827 || 65–76
|- bgcolor="ffbbbb"
| 142 || September 6 || @ Athletics || 1–7 || Adams || Haney (9–13) || — || 14,404 || 65–77
|- bgcolor="ffbbbb"
| 143 || September 7 || @ Athletics || 6–13 || Prieto || Belcher (13–9) || — || 13,175 || 65–78
|- bgcolor="ffbbbb"
| 144 || September 8 || @ Athletics || 7–8 (10) || Corsi || Pichardo (3–5) || — || 17,208 || 65–79
|- bgcolor="ccffcc"
| 145 || September 10 || Mariners || 4–2 || Rosado (6–5) || Torres || Bluma (1) || 12,499 || 66–79
|- bgcolor="ccffcc"
| 146 || September 11 || Mariners || 4–2 || Linton (7–9) || Moyer || Bluma (2) || 13,078 || 67–79
|- bgcolor="ffbbbb"
| 147 || September 12 || Mariners || 5–8 || Mulholland || Haney (9–14) || Charlton || 15,045 || 67–80
|- bgcolor="ccffcc"
| 148 || September 13 || Angels || 8–2 || Belcher (14–9) || Abbott || — || 13,083 || 68–80
|- bgcolor="ccffcc"
| 149 || September 14 || Angels || 8–5 || Appier (13–10) || Dickson || — || 17,174 || 69–80
|- bgcolor="ccffcc"
| 150 || September 16 || Twins || 6–5 || Rosado (7–5) || Radke || Bluma (3) || 16,843 || 70–80
|- bgcolor="ccffcc"
| 151 || September 17 || Twins || 4–2 || Haney (10–14) || Aldred || Bluma (4) || 11,809 || 71–80
|- bgcolor="ffbbbb"
| 152 || September 18 || Twins || 4–7 || Miller || Belcher (14–10) || — || 11,588 || 71–81
|- bgcolor="ffbbbb"
| 153 || September 19 || @ Indians || 1–9 || Ogea || Appier (13–11) || — || 42,297 || 71–82
|- bgcolor="ccffcc"
| 154 || September 20 || @ Indians || 6–4 || Bevil (1–0) || Nagy || Bluma (5) || 42,358 || 72–82
|- bgcolor="ffbbbb"
| 155 || September 21 || @ Indians || 4–13 || Hershiser || Rosado (7–6) || — || 42,339 || 72–83
|- bgcolor="ffbbbb"
| 156 || September 22 || @ Indians || 5–6 || McDowell || Jacome (0–4) || Mesa || 42,291 || 72–84
|- bgcolor="ffbbbb"
| 157 || September 24 || @ White Sox || 2–3 || Castillo || Belcher (14–11) || — || 14,348 || 72–85
|- bgcolor="ccffcc"
| 158 || September 25 || @ White Sox || 8–2 || Appier (14–11) || Tapani || — || 15,911 || 73–85
|- bgcolor="ccffcc"
| 159 || September 27 || Indians || 11–6 || Rosado (8–6) || Hershiser || — || 15,939 || 74–85
|- bgcolor="ffbbbb"
| 160 || September 28 || Indians || 4–5 || Mercker || Scanlan (0–1) || Mesa || 19,820 || 74–86
|- bgcolor="ccffcc"
| 161 || September 29 || Indians || 4–1 || Belcher (15–11) || Ogea || Pichardo (3) || 14,556 || 75–86
|-

|-
| Legend:       = Win       = LossBold = Royals team member

Detailed records

Roster

Player stats

Batting

Starters by position
Note: Pos = Position; G = Games played; AB = At bats; H = Hits; Avg. = Batting average; HR = Home runs; RBI = Runs batted in

Other batters
Note: G = Games played; AB = At bats; H = Hits; Avg. = Batting average; HR = Home runs; RBI = Runs batted in

Pitching

Starting pitchers
Note: G = Games pitched; IP = Innings pitched; W = Wins; L = Losses; ERA = Earned run average; SO = Strikeouts

Other pitchers
Note: G = Games pitched; IP = Innings pitched; W = Wins; L = Losses; ERA = Earned run average; SO = Strikeouts

Relief pitchers
Note: G = Games pitched; W = Wins; L = Losses; SV = Saves; ERA = Earned run average; SO = Strikeouts

Farm system 

LEAGUE CHAMPIONS: Wilmington

References

1996 Kansas City Royals at Baseball Reference
1996 Kansas City Royals at Baseball Almanac

Kansas City Royals seasons
Kansas City Royals season
Kansas